Sphenomorphus zimmeri  is a species of skink, a lizard in the family Scincidae. The species is endemic to Sulawesi, Indonesia.

Etymology
The specific name, zimmeri, is in honor of German zoologist Carl Wilhelm Erich Zimmer.

Reproduction
The mode of reproduction of S. zimmeri is unknown.

References

Further reading
Ahl E (1933). "Ergebnisse der Celebes und Halmahera Expedition Heinrich 1930–32. Reptilien und Amphibien ". Mitteilungen aus dem Zoologischen Museum in Berlin 19: 577–583. ("Lygosoma (Otosaurus) zimmeri ", new species, p. 577). (in German).
Bauer AM, Shea GM, Günther R (2003). "An annotated catalogue of the types of scincid lizards (Reptilia: Squamata: Scincidae) in the collection of the Museum für Naturkunde der Humboldt-Universität zu Berlin (ZMB)". Mitteilungen aus dem Museum für Naturkunde in Berlin, Zoologische Reihe 79: 253–321. (Sphenomorphus zimmeri, new combination, p. 293).
Koch A (2012). Discovery, Diversity, and Distribution of the Amphibians and Reptiles of Sulawesi and its offshore Islands. Frankfurt am Main: Chimaira. 374 pp. .

zimmeri
Taxa named by Ernst Ahl
Reptiles described in 1933
Reptiles of Sulawesi